The Handball Federation of Serbia (RSS) is the governing body of team handball in Serbia. It is based in Belgrade.

Hosted tournaments
 1979 Women's Junior World Handball Championship
 2004 European Men's U-18 Handball Championship
 2009 European Women's U-17 Handball Championship
 2012 European Men's Handball Championship
 2012 European Women's Handball Championship
 2013 World Women's Handball Championship

External links

  
 Rukometasi.com 

Serbia
Sports governing bodies in Serbia
Sports organizations established in 1949
1949 establishments in Serbia